Nikolsky (masculine), Nikolskaya (feminine), or Nikolskoye (neuter) may refer to:

Places
Nikolski, Alaska, a census-designated place in Alaska
Nikolske, Ukraine, an urban locality in Ukraine
Nikolsky District, several districts in Russia
Nikolsky (inhabited locality) (Nikolskaya, Nikolskoye), several inhabited localities in Russia
Nikolskoye Urban Settlement, several municipal urban settlements in Russia
Nikolskoe Cemetery, burial ground in Saint Petersburg

Other 
Nikolsky (surname), including a list of people with the name
Nikolski Air Station, an airport located in Nikolski, Alaska
Nikolskoye Airport, an airport in Kamchatka Krai, Russia
Nikolski (novel), a novel by Canadian writer Nicolas Dickner
Nikolsky Old Believer Monastery, a monastery near Preobrazhenskoye Cemetery in Moscow, Russia

See also
Nikolsk, several inhabited localities in Russia
Nikolsk Urban Settlement, several municipal urban settlements in Russia
Nikolsky's sign, a clinical dermatological sign
Nikolsky's adder, common name of Vipera nikolskii, a venomous viper species endemic in Ukraine